The  is a group of archaeological sites containing ancient industrial facilities located in the cities of Kusatsu and  Ōtsu in the Kansai region of Japan. These site were collectively designated a National Historic Site of Japan in 1985.

Overview
The Seta sites are located in the Seta Hills, which extend from the southeastern part of Lake Biwa inland to Kusatsu and the surrounding areas. The  site in the Noji neighborhood of Kusatsu was first designated as a National Historic Site in 1985. It is the largest and best preserved of many iron smelting ruins which were built in the Seta Hills due to local iron ore deposits and abundant forest resources that provided charcoal for iron making in the Nara period.  

Products made at these various industries sites were transported down the Seta River to Lake Biwa for distribution, and were used in the subsequent construction of Fujiwara-kyo and Heian-kyo. These sites were most active during the brief period that the capital was located at the Ōmi Ōtsu Palace (667-672 AD). 

These sites are located a ten-minute walk from the "Bunka Zone Mae" bus stop on the Teisan Konan Kotsu Bus  from Seta Station on the JR Central Biwako Line.

See also
List of Historic Sites of Japan (Shiga)

References

External links
Otsu City Museum of History 
Shiga Prefecture Department of History 

Kusatsu, Shiga
Ōtsu
Archaeological sites in Japan
History of Shiga Prefecture
Historic Sites of Japan